Brian McComas is the self-titled debut studio album by American country music singer Brian McComas. It was released on July 22, 2003 via Lyric Street Records. It includes the singles "Night Disappear with You," "I Could Never Love You Enough," "99.9% Sure (I've Never Been Here Before)" and "You're in My Head," all of which charted between 2001 and 2004.

History
The album includes two songs that McComas released between 2001 and 2002: "Night Disappear with You" and its b-side "I Could Never Love You Enough," which respectively reached numbers 41 and 46 on the Hot Country Singles & Tracks (now Hot Country Songs) charts. In 2003, he charted within the country Top 40 for the first time with "99.9% Sure (I've Never Been Here Before)" at number 10, and "You're in My Head" at 21. McComas later released a fifth single for Lyric Street, "The Middle of Nowhere," which reached number 43 in 2005 and never appeared on an album.

Critical reception
Jeffrey B. Remz of Country Standard Time gave the album a mostly-negative review. He praised McComas's vocal performances on the up-tempo songs such as "You're in My Head," but thought that most of the songs were "pleasant enough, but no more." Brian Mansfield gave the album two-and-a-half stars out of four in a review for USA Today, referring to McComas as a "likeable fellow" and saying that the sound of "99.9% Sure" "blend[s] agreeably on contemporary country radio."

Track listing

Personnel
As listed in liner notes.
Tim Akers – keyboards
Steve Brewster – drums, percussion
Joel Carr – acoustic guitar, electric guitar
Eric Darken – percussion
Dan Dugmore – steel guitar, Dobro, slide guitar
David Grissom – electric guitar
Aubrey Haynie – fiddle, mandolin
Brian McComas – vocals
Jerry McPherson – electric guitar
Leon Medica – bass guitar
Gene Miller – background vocals
Steve Nathan – keyboards
Leigh Reynolds – acoustic guitar, banjo
John Wesley Ryles – background vocals
Russell Terrell – background vocals
Biff Watson – acoustic guitar
Lonnie Wilson – drums
Glenn Worf – bass guitar

Strings on "I'll Always Be There for You" performed by the Nashville String Machine; arranged by Bergen White.

Chart performance

References

2003 debut albums
Brian McComas albums
Lyric Street Records albums